Henry C. Boren (February 10, 1921 in Pike County, IL - October 17, 2013 in Pittsboro, North Carolina)  was a historian and author.  He was professor emeritus of history at the University of North Carolina.

Professional life
Boren is an author of numerous professional articles and books on ancient history specializing in ancient Rome, including "Roman Society, A Social, Economic and Cultural History."

References

1921 births
2013 deaths
University of North Carolina at Chapel Hill faculty
American historians